Rudolf Miethig (17 October 1921 – 10 June 1943) was a German Luftwaffe military aviator during World War II, a fighter ace credited with 101 aerial victories—that is, 101 aerial combat encounters resulting in the destruction of the enemy aircraft. All of his victories were claimed over the Soviet Air Forces in an unknown number of combat missions.

Born in Zwickau, Miethig was trained as a fighter pilot and posted to Jagdgeschwader 52 (JG 52–52nd Fighter Wing) in early 1941. Fighting on the Eastern Front, he claimed his first aerial victory on 14 November 1941 during Operation Barbarossa, the German invasion of the Soviet Union. In July 1942, Miethig was appointed Staffelkapitän (squadron leader) of 3. Staffel (3rd squadron) of JG 52. Three months later, he was awarded the Knight's Cross of the Iron Cross on 29 October 1942. On 8 June 1943, Miethig was credited with his 100th aerial victory. Two days later, he was killed in action following a mid-air collision with an enemy aircraft over the Kuban bridgehead.

Career
Miethig, who was born on 17 October 1921 in Zwickau, volunteered for service in the Luftwaffe in 1939. Following flight training, he was transferred to the 3. Staffel (3rd squadron) of Jagdgeschwader 52 (JG 52—52nd Fighter Wing) in the spring of 1941. At the time the Staffel was commanded by Oberleutnant Helmut Kühle who was replaced by Oberleutnant Helmut Bennemann on 27 April. I. Gruppe (1st group) of JG 52 to which 3. Staffel was subordinated was headed by Hauptmann Wolfgang Ewald at the time. Until 21 February, the entire I. Gruppe was based at an airfield at Katwijk in the Netherlands where it was tasked with patrolling the Dutch coast area and German Bight, the three Staffeln were then deployed at various airfields on the Dutch, German and Danish North Sea coast.

On 25 May, I. Gruppe was placed under the command of Hauptmann Karl-Heinz Leesmann.

War against the Soviet Union

On 22 June, German forces had launched Operation Barbarossa, the invasion of the Soviet Union. Pror to its deployment on the Eastern Front, I. Gruppe was fully equipped with the Messerschmitt Bf 109 F-2. The Gruppe reached Orsha on 27 September before heading to Ponyatovka on 2 October. There, the Gruppe was initially subordinated to the Stab (headquarters unit) of Jagdgeschwader 27 (JG 27—27th Fighter Wing) and supported German forces fighting in the Battle of Vyazma  as part of Operation Typhoon, the code name of the German offensive on Moscow. Here, Miethig claimed his first aerial victory, a Mikoyan-Gurevich MiG-1, on 14 November 1941 and his second victory, an I-61 fighter, an early German designation for the Mikoyan-Gurevich MiG-3, on 27 November. The failed assault on Moscow forced I. Gruppe to retreat to an airfield at Dugino, present-day Novodugino, on 15 December where they stayed until 31 January 1942. Here, Miethig claimed a Polikarpov R-5 reconnaissance bomber on 28 January.

On 1 February. I Gruppe was withdrawn from combat operations and was moved to Smolensk and then further west to Orsha. From 8 to 12 February the Gruppe took a train to Jesau near Königsberg, present-day Kaliningrad in Russia, for a period of recuperation and replenishment where they received new Bf 109 F-4 aircraft. The Gruppe was ordered to Olmütz, present-day Olomouc in Czech Republic on 11 April. On 17 May, I. Gruppe relocated to Artyomovsk, present-day Bakhmut. From Artyomovsk, JG 52 supported the German forces fighting in the Second Battle of Kharkov. Here, Miethig claimed four further aerial victories by the end of May, including a Petlyakov Pe-2 bomber on 26 May, a MiG-1 fighter and an Ilyushin Il-2 ground-attack aircraft on 29 May, and another Il-2 ground-attack aircraft on 31 May.

On 1 June, the Gruppe then moved to an airfield at Grakowo, located approximately halfway between Kharkov and Kupiansk. On 13 June, Miethig claimed two Yakovlev Yak-1 fighters shot down. The next day, Bennemann replaced Leesmann, who was transferred, as Gruppenkommandeur (group commander) of I. Gruppe of JG 52. In consequence, command of 3. Staffel was passed on to Leutnant Karl Rüttger. Miethig claimed a Soviet flown Hawker Hurricane fighter on 23 June followed by a Lavochkin-Gorbunov-Gudkov LaGG-3 fighter the next day. On 28 June, German forces had launched Case Blue, the strategic summer offensive in southern Russia. The next day, he claimed another Hurricane fighter followed by a LaGG-3 fighter on 30 June.

Squadron leader
On 2 July, Miethig was appointed Staffelkapitän (squadron leader) of the 3. Staffel of JG 52. He replaced Rüttger who had become a prisoner of war after he made a forced landing behind enemy lines near Kruty the day before. During this period, Miethig had claimed a Hurricane fighter on 4 July and a R-5 reconnaissance bomber on 8 July. On 10 July, Miethig claimed a MiG-1 fighter. According to Obermaier, Miethig had been awarded the Honor Goblet of the Luftwaffe on 6 July. Patzwall however dates the presentation of Honor Goblet on 19 October. On 2 August, I. Gruppe was ordered to Kerch on the Kerch Peninsula. At the time, the Gruppe was moved around as a kind of fire brigade, deployed in areas where the Soviet Air Forces was particular active. The Gruppe then moved to Oryol on 15 August. There, Miethig claimed an I-180 fighter, a designation for the Yakovlev Yak-7, on 18 August and two Pe-2 bombers on 23 August.

The following day, I. Gruppe moved to Dedjurewo near Rzhev in the central sector of the Eastern Front where the Gruppe was subordinated to Jagdgeschwader 51 (JG 51—51st Fighter Wing), fighting in the Battle of Rzhev. On 29 October 1942, Miethig and Leutnant Walter Krupinski from 6. Staffel were awarded the Knight's Cross of the Iron Cross. On 8 June 1943, Miethig was credited with his 100th aerial victory. He was the 41st Luftwaffe pilot to achieve the century mark.

Miethig, flying Bf 109 G-2 (Werknummer 14 602—factory number), had shot down one of the Yak-1 fighters and collided with his crashing opponent. Miethig was posthumously awarded the German Cross in Gold as well as posthumously promoted to Hauptmann (captain). Leutnant Johann-Hermann Meier temporarily was given command of 3. Staffel until Hauptmann Erich Schreiber was officially appointed Staffelkapitän on 15 July.

Summary of career

Aerial victory claims
According to US historian David T. Zabecki, Miethig was credited with 101 aerial victories. Schreier and Spick also list Miethig with 101 aerial victories claimed in an unknown number of combat missions. Mathews and Foreman, authors of Luftwaffe Aces — Biographies and Victory Claims, researched the German Federal Archives and state that Miethig was credited with 100 aerial victories, all of which claimed on the Eastern Front.

Victory claims were logged to a map-reference (PQ = Planquadrat), for example "PQ 47852". These sectors were then subdivided into 36 smaller units to give a location area 3 × 4 km in size.

Awards
 Honor Goblet of the Luftwaffe on 19 October 1942 as Leutnant and pilot
 Knight's Cross of the Iron Cross on 29 October 1942 as Staffelführer and Leutnant of the 3./Jagdgeschwader 52
 German Cross in Gold on 19 January 1944 (posthumously) as Hauptmann in the 3./Jagdgeschwader 52

Notes

References

Citations

Bibliography

 
 
 
 
 
 
 
 
 
 
 
 
 
 
 
 
 
 

1921 births
1943 deaths
People from Zwickau
Luftwaffe pilots
German World War II flying aces
Luftwaffe personnel killed in World War II
Recipients of the Gold German Cross
Recipients of the Knight's Cross of the Iron Cross
Military personnel from Saxony